Juliette Marian Del Valle Pardau López (born 21 August 1986) is a Venezuelan actress and singer.

Career
Juliette became interested in the performing arts at the age of 12 and while at school, she participated in small plays. She graduated from the Universidad Central de Venezuela with a Bachelor's degree in social communication.

In 2011, she participated in the telenovela Natalia del Mar where she played a blind girl. Her character was well received by the critics.

In 2013, she became part of the telenovela De todas maneras rosa where she plays Patricia, a rebellious girl and leader of a musical band called "Serpientes Venenosas.

Television
 Harina de otro costal (2010) as "Coromotico" Hernández
 Natalia del Mar (2011) as Rosario Uribe
 De todas maneras Rosa (2013) as Patricia Macho Vergara
 El tesoro (2016) as Jenny Murcia
 El Chapo (2017) as Graciela Guzmán 
 La Nocturna (2017) as Lucy
 Pa’ quererte (2020) as Danny Daza
 Falsa Identidad (first season) as gabriela

Films
 Papita, maní, tostón (2013)
 La Rectora (2014 - Colombian Film) 
 Papita 2da base (Dec 2017)
 Bolívar (Netflix series - TV Caracol 2019)

References

External links
 

1986 births
Actresses from Caracas
Venezuelan film actresses
Venezuelan telenovela actresses
Living people